Dime with a Halo is a 1963 film directed by Boris Sagal. It stars Barbara Luna and Rafael López.

Plot
Four thieving street urchins, led by Chuy, bet $2 on a pick-six horse race every week. A kindly American, Mr. Jones, places their bet for them while visiting Tijuana each week to indulge himself at strip clubs and with prostitutes. The gang is joined by a new kid in town, Jose, whose sister, Juanita, is stripping at a local club. To get some luck, the kids decide to steal a dime from the church poor box to "make Jesus a partner" in the bet. They win $81,000. Unwilling to trust an adult to cash in their ticket, Juanita contacts Mr. Jones in Los Angeles. Mr. Jones drives to cash in the bet, but has a heart attack on the way. The ticket flutters away in the breeze. Unable to find the betting ticket, the boys return the dime to the poor box.

Production notes
Dime with a Halo was the last movie issued by the Hal Roach Studios. Director Boris Sagal used Roach's forlorn, run-down facilities because they looked like a decaying Mexican city.

The film's copyright was renewed.

Cast
 Barbara Luna as Juanita
 Rafael López as Chuy Perez
 Roger Mobley as Jose
 Paul Langton as Mr. Jones
 Robert Carricart as Cashier
 Jennifer Bishop as Stripper

References

External links
 

1963 films
Films directed by Boris Sagal
Films set in Mexico
Films set in Tijuana
Metro-Goldwyn-Mayer films
1960s English-language films
American comedy films
1963 comedy films
Films about striptease
Films scored by Ronald Stein
1960s American films